Sino-Tibetan, also cited as Trans-Himalayan in a few sources, is a family of more than 400 languages, second only to Indo-European in number of native speakers. The vast majority of these are the 1.3 billion native speakers of Chinese languages. Other Sino-Tibetan languages with large numbers of speakers include Burmese (33 million) and the Tibetic languages (6 million). Other languages of the family are spoken in the Himalayas, the Southeast Asian Massif, and the eastern edge of the Tibetan Plateau. Most of these have small speech communities in remote mountain areas, and as such are poorly documented.

Several low-level subgroups have been securely reconstructed, but reconstruction of a proto-language for the family as a whole is still at an early stage, so the higher-level structure of Sino-Tibetan remains unclear. Although the family is traditionally presented as divided into Sinitic (i.e. Chinese) and Tibeto-Burman branches, a common origin of the non-Sinitic languages has never been demonstrated. Although Chinese linguists generally include Kra–Dai and Hmong–Mien languages within Sino-Tibetan, most other linguists have excluded them since the 1940s. Several links to other language families have been proposed, but none have broad acceptance.

History
A genetic relationship between Chinese, Tibetan, Burmese and other languages was first proposed in the early 19th century and is now broadly accepted. The initial focus on languages of civilizations with long literary traditions has been broadened to include less widely spoken languages, some of which have only recently, or never, been written. However, the reconstruction of the family is much less developed than for families such as Indo-European or Austroasiatic. Difficulties have included the great diversity of the languages, the lack of inflection in many of them, and the effects of language contact. In addition, many of the smaller languages are spoken in mountainous areas that are difficult to access, and are often also sensitive border zones.

Early work 
During the 18th century, several scholars had noticed parallels between Tibetan and Burmese, both languages with extensive literary traditions. Early in the following century, Brian Houghton Hodgson and others noted that many non-literary languages of the highlands of northeast India and Southeast Asia were also related to these. The name "Tibeto-Burman" was first applied to this group in 1856 by James Richardson Logan, who added Karen in 1858. The third volume of the Linguistic Survey of India, edited by Sten Konow, was devoted to the Tibeto-Burman languages of British India.

Studies of the "Indo-Chinese" languages of Southeast Asia from the mid-19th century by Logan and others revealed that they comprised four families: Tibeto-Burman, Tai, Mon–Khmer and Malayo-Polynesian. Julius Klaproth had noted in 1823 that Burmese, Tibetan and Chinese all shared common basic vocabulary but that Thai, Mon, and Vietnamese were quite different. Ernst Kuhn envisaged a group with two branches, Chinese-Siamese and Tibeto-Burman. August Conrady called this group Indo-Chinese in his influential 1896 classification, though he had doubts about Karen. Conrady's terminology was widely used, but there was uncertainty regarding his exclusion of Vietnamese. Franz Nikolaus Finck in 1909 placed Karen as a third branch of Chinese-Siamese.

Jean Przyluski introduced the French term sino-tibétain as the title of his chapter on the group in Meillet and Cohen's Les langues du monde in 1924. He divided them into three groups: Tibeto-Burman, Chinese and Tai, and was uncertain about the affinity of Karen and Hmong–Mien. The English translation "Sino-Tibetan" first appeared in a short note by Przyluski and Luce in 1931.

Shafer and Benedict 
In 1935, the anthropologist Alfred Kroeber started the Sino-Tibetan Philology Project, funded by the Works Project Administration and based at the University of California, Berkeley. The project was supervised by Robert Shafer until late 1938, and then by Paul K. Benedict. Under their direction, the staff of 30 non-linguists collated all the available documentation of Sino-Tibetan languages. The result was eight copies of a 15-volume typescript entitled Sino-Tibetan Linguistics. This work was never published, but furnished the data for a series of papers by Shafer, as well as Shafer's five-volume Introduction to Sino-Tibetan and Benedict's Sino-Tibetan, a Conspectus.

Benedict completed the manuscript of his work in 1941, but it was not published until 1972. Instead of building the entire family tree, he set out to reconstruct a Proto-Tibeto-Burman language by comparing five major languages, with occasional comparisons with other languages. He reconstructed a two-way distinction on initial consonants based on voicing, with aspiration conditioned by pre-initial consonants that had been retained in Tibetic but lost in many other languages. Thus, Benedict reconstructed the following initials:

Although the initial consonants of cognates tend to have the same place and manner of articulation, voicing and aspiration is often unpredictable. This irregularity was attacked by Roy Andrew Miller, though Benedict's supporters attribute it to the effects of prefixes that have been lost and are often unrecoverable. The issue remains unsolved today. It was cited together with the lack of reconstructable shared morphology, and evidence that much shared lexical material has been borrowed from Chinese into Tibeto-Burman, by Christopher Beckwith, one of the few scholars still arguing that Chinese is not related to Tibeto-Burman.

Benedict also reconstructed, at least for Tibeto-Burman, prefixes such as the causative s-, the intransitive m-, and r-, b- g- and d- of uncertain function, as well as suffixes -s, -t and -n.

Study of literary languages 

Old Chinese is by far the oldest recorded Sino-Tibetan language, with inscriptions dating from around 1250 BC and a huge body of literature from the first millennium BC, but the Chinese script is not alphabetic. Scholars have sought to reconstruct the phonology of Old Chinese by comparing the obscure descriptions of the sounds of Middle Chinese in medieval dictionaries with phonetic elements in Chinese characters and the rhyming patterns of early poetry. The first complete reconstruction, the Grammata Serica Recensa of Bernard Karlgren, was used by Benedict and Shafer.

Karlgren's reconstruction was somewhat unwieldy, with many sounds having a highly non-uniform distribution. Later scholars have revised it by drawing on a range of other sources. Some proposals were based on cognates in other Sino-Tibetan languages, though workers have also found solely Chinese evidence for them. For example, recent reconstructions of Old Chinese have reduced Karlgren's 15 vowels to a six-vowel system originally suggested by Nicholas Bodman. Similarly, Karlgren's *l has been recast as *r, with a different initial interpreted as *l, matching Tibeto-Burman cognates, but also supported by Chinese transcriptions of foreign names. A growing number of scholars believe that Old Chinese did not use tones, and that the tones of Middle Chinese developed from final consonants. One of these, *-s, is believed to be a suffix, with cognates in other Sino-Tibetan languages.

Tibetic has extensive written records from the adoption of writing by the Tibetan Empire in the mid-7th century. The earliest records of Burmese (such as the 12th-century Myazedi inscription) are more limited, but later an extensive literature developed. Both languages are recorded in alphabetic scripts ultimately derived from the Brahmi script of Ancient India. Most comparative work has used the conservative written forms of these languages, following the dictionaries of Jäschke (Tibetan) and Judson (Burmese), though both contain entries from a wide range of periods.

There are also extensive records in Tangut, the language of the Western Xia (1038–1227). Tangut is recorded in a Chinese-inspired logographic script, whose interpretation presents many difficulties, even though multilingual dictionaries have been found.

Gong Hwang-cherng has compared Old Chinese, Tibetic, Burmese and Tangut in an effort to establish sound correspondences between those languages. He found that Tibetic and Burmese  correspond to two Old Chinese vowels, *a and *ə. While this has been considered evidence for a separate Tibeto-Burman subgroup, Hill (2014) finds that Burmese has distinct correspondences for Old Chinese rhymes -ay : *-aj and -i : *-əj, and hence argues that the development *ə > *a occurred independently in Tibetan and Burmese.

Fieldwork 
The descriptions of non-literary languages used by Shafer and Benedict were often produced by missionaries and colonial administrators of varying linguistic skill. Most of the smaller Sino-Tibetan languages are spoken in inaccessible mountainous areas, many of which are politically or militarily sensitive and thus closed to investigators. Until the 1980s, the best-studied areas were Nepal and northern Thailand. In the 1980s and 1990s, new surveys were published from the Himalayas and southwestern China. Of particular interest was the discovery of a new branch of the family, the Qiangic languages of western Sichuan and adjacent areas.

Distribution

Most of the current spread of Sino-Tibetan languages is the result of historical expansions of the three groups with the most speakers – Chinese, Burmese and Tibetic – replacing an unknown number of earlier languages. These groups also have the longest literary traditions of the family. The remaining languages are spoken in mountainous areas, along the southern slopes of the Himalayas, the Southeast Asian Massif and the eastern edge of the Tibetan Plateau.

Contemporary languages
The branch with the largest number of speakers by far is the Sinitic languages, with 1.3 billion speakers, most of whom live in the eastern half of China. The first records of Chinese are oracle bone inscriptions from c. 1250 BC, when Old Chinese was spoken around the middle reaches of the Yellow River. Chinese has since expanded throughout China, forming a family whose diversity has been compared with the Romance languages. Diversity is greater in the rugged terrain of southeast China than in the North China Plain.

Burmese is the national language of Myanmar, and the first language of some 33 million people. Burmese speakers first entered the northern Irrawaddy basin from what is now western Yunnan in the early ninth century, in conjunction with an invasion by Nanzhao that shattered the Pyu city-states. Other Burmish languages are still spoken in Dehong Prefecture in the far west of Yunnan. By the 11th century, their Pagan Kingdom had expanded over the whole basin. The oldest texts, such as the Myazedi inscription, date from the early 12th century. The closely related Loloish languages are spoken by 9 million people in the mountains of western Sichuan, Yunnan and nearby areas in northern Myanmar, Thailand, Laos and Vietnam.

The Tibetic languages are spoken by some 6 million people on the Tibetan Plateau and neighbouring areas in the Himalayas and western Sichuan. They are descended from Old Tibetan, which was originally spoken in the Yarlung Valley before it was spread by the expansion of the Tibetan Empire in the seventh century. Although the empire collapsed in the ninth century, Classical Tibetan remained influential as the liturgical language of Tibetan Buddhism.

The remaining languages are spoken in upland areas. Southernmost are the Karen languages, spoken by 4 million people in the hill country along the Myanmar–Thailand border, with the greatest diversity in the Karen Hills, which are believed to be the homeland of the group. The highlands stretching from northeast India to northern Myanmar contain over 100 highly diverse Sino-Tibetan languages. Other Sino-Tibetan languages are found along the southern slopes of the Himalayas and the eastern edge of the Tibetan plateau.
The 22 official languages listed in the Eighth Schedule to the Constitution of India include only two Sino-Tibetan languages, namely Meitei (officially called Manipuri) and Bodo.

Homeland
There have been a range of proposals for the Sino-Tibetan urheimat, reflecting the uncertainty about the classification of the family and its time depth. Three major hypotheses for the place and time of Sino-Tibetan unity have been presented:
 The most commonly cited hypothesis associates the family with the Neolithic Yangshao culture (7000–5000 years BP) of the Yellow River basin, with an expansion driven by millet agriculture. This scenario is associated with a proposed primary split between Sinitic in the east and the Tibeto-Burman languages, often assigned to the Majiayao culture (5300–4000 years BP) in the upper reaches of the Yellow River on the northeast edge of the Tibetan plateau. For example, James Matisoff proposes a split around 6000 years BP, with Chinese-speakers settling along the Yellow River and other groups migrating south down the Yangtze, Mekong, Salween and Brahmaputra rivers.
 George van Driem proposes a Sino-Tibetan homeland in the Sichuan Basin before 9000 years BP, with an associated taxonomy reflecting various outward migrations over time, first into northeast India, and later north (the predecessors of Chinese and Tibetic) and south (Karen and Lolo–Burmese).
 Roger Blench argues that agriculture cannot be reconstructed for Proto-Sino-Tibetan. Blench and Mark Post have proposed that the earliest speakers of Sino-Tibetan were not farmers but highly diverse foragers in the eastern foothills of the Himalayas in Northeast India, the area of greatest diversity, around 9000 years BP. They then envisage a series of migrations over the following millennia, with Sinitic representing one of the groups that migrated into China.
Zhang et al. (2019) performed a computational phylogenetic analysis of 109 Sino-Tibetan languages to suggest a Sino-Tibetan homeland in northern China near the Yellow River basin. The study further suggests that there was an initial major split between the Sinitic and Tibeto-Burman languages approximately 4,200 to 7,800 years ago (with an average of 5,900 years ago), associated with the Yangshao and/or Majiayao cultures. Sagart et al. (2019) performed another phylogenetic analysis based on different data and methods to arrive at the same conclusions with respect to the homeland and divergence model but proposed an earlier root age of approximately 7,200 years ago, associating its origin with millet farmers of the late Cishan culture and early Yangshao culture.

Classification

Several low-level branches of the family, particularly Lolo-Burmese, have been securely reconstructed, but in the absence of a secure reconstruction of a Sino-Tibetan proto-language, the higher-level structure of the family remains unclear. Thus, a conservative classification of Sino-Tibetan/Tibeto-Burman would posit several dozen small coordinate families and isolates; attempts at subgrouping are either geographic conveniences or hypotheses for further research.

Li (1937)
In a survey in the 1937 Chinese Yearbook, Li Fang-Kuei described the family as consisting of four branches:
Indo-Chinese (Sino-Tibetan)
 Chinese
 Tai (later expanded to Kam–Tai)
 Miao–Yao (Hmong–Mien)
 Tibeto-Burman

Tai and Miao–Yao were included because they shared isolating typology, tone systems and some vocabulary with Chinese. At the time, tone was considered so fundamental to language that tonal typology could be used as the basis for classification. In the Western scholarly community, these languages are no longer included in Sino-Tibetan, with the similarities attributed to diffusion across the Mainland Southeast Asia linguistic area, especially since . The exclusions of Vietnamese by Kuhn and of Tai and Miao–Yao by Benedict were vindicated in 1954 when André-Georges Haudricourt demonstrated that the tones of Vietnamese were reflexes of final consonants from Proto-Mon–Khmer.

Many Chinese linguists continue to follow Li's classification. However, this arrangement remains problematic. For example, there is disagreement over whether to include the entire Kra–Dai family or just Kam–Tai (Zhuang–Dong excludes the Kra languages), because the Chinese cognates that form the basis of the putative relationship are not found in all branches of the family and have not been reconstructed for the family as a whole. In addition, Kam–Tai itself no longer appears to be a valid node within Kra–Dai.

Benedict (1942)
Benedict overtly excluded Vietnamese (placing it in Mon–Khmer) as well as Hmong–Mien and Kra–Dai (placing them in Austro-Tai). He otherwise retained the outlines of Conrady's Indo-Chinese classification, though putting Karen in an intermediate position:

Sino-Tibetan
 Chinese
 Tibeto-Karen
 Karen
 Tibeto-Burman

Shafer (1955)
Shafer criticized the division of the family into Tibeto-Burman and Sino-Daic branches, which he attributed to the different groups of languages studied by Konow and other scholars in British India on the one hand and by Henri Maspero and other French linguists on the other. He proposed a detailed classification, with six top-level divisions:

Sino-Tibetan
 Sinitic
 Daic
 Bodic
 Burmic
 Baric
 Karenic

Shafer was sceptical of the inclusion of Daic, but after meeting Maspero in Paris decided to retain it pending a definitive resolution of the question.

Matisoff (1978, 2015)
James Matisoff abandoned Benedict's Tibeto-Karen hypothesis:

Sino-Tibetan
 Chinese
 Tibeto-Burman

Some more-recent Western scholars, such as Bradley (1997) and La Polla (2003), have retained Matisoff's two primary branches, though differing in the details of Tibeto-Burman. However, Jacques (2006) notes, "comparative work has never been able to put forth evidence for common innovations to all the Tibeto-Burman languages (the Sino-Tibetan languages to the exclusion of Chinese)" and that "it no longer seems justified to treat Chinese as the first branching of the Sino-Tibetan family," because the morphological divide between Chinese and Tibeto-Burman has been bridged by recent reconstructions of Old Chinese.

The internal structure of Sino-Tibetan has been tentatively revised as the following Stammbaum by Matisoff in the final print release of the Sino-Tibetan Etymological Dictionary and Thesaurus (STEDT) in 2015. Matisoff acknowledges that the position of Chinese within the family remains an open question.

Sino-Tibetan
Chinese
Tibeto-Burman
Northeast Indian areal group
"North Assam"
Tani
Deng
Kuki-Chin
"Naga" areal group
Central Naga (Ao group)
Angami–Pochuri group
Zeme group
Tangkhulic
Meitei
Mikir / Karbi
Mru
Sal
Bodo–Garo
Northern Naga / Konyakian
Jingpho–Asakian
Himalayish
Tibeto-Kanauri
Western Himalayish
Bodic
Lepcha
Tamangish
Dhimal
Newar
Kiranti
Kham-Magar-Chepang
Tangut-Qiang
Tangut
Qiangic
Rgyalrongic
Nungic
Tujia
Lolo-Burmese–Naxi
Lolo-Burmese
Naxi
Karenic
Bai

Starostin (1996)
Sergei Starostin proposed that both the Kiranti languages and Chinese are divergent from a "core" Tibeto-Burman of at least Bodish, Lolo-Burmese, Tamangic, Jinghpaw, Kukish, and Karen (other families were not analysed) in a hypothesis called Sino-Kiranti. The proposal takes two forms: that Sinitic and Kiranti are themselves a valid node or that the two are not demonstrably close, so that Sino-Tibetan has three primary branches:

Sino-Tibetan (version 1)
 Sino-Kiranti
 Tibeto-Burman

Sino-Tibetan (version 2)
 Chinese
 Kiranti
 Tibeto-Burman

Van Driem (1997, 2001)
Van Driem, like Shafer, rejects a primary split between Chinese and the rest, suggesting that Chinese owes its traditional privileged place in Sino-Tibetan to historical, typological, and cultural, rather than linguistic, criteria. He calls the entire family "Tibeto-Burman", a name he says has historical primacy, but other linguists who reject a privileged position for Chinese nevertheless continue to call the resulting family "Sino-Tibetan".

Like Matisoff, van Driem acknowledges that the relationships of the "Kuki–Naga" languages (Kuki, Mizo, Meitei, etc.), both amongst each other and to the other languages of the family, remain unclear. However, rather than placing them in a geographic grouping, as Matisoff does, van Driem leaves them unclassified. He has proposed several hypotheses, including the reclassification of Chinese to a Sino-Bodic subgroup:

Tibeto-Burman
 Western (Baric, Brahmaputran, or Sal): Dhimal, Bodo–Garo, Konyak, Kachin–Luic
 Eastern
 Northern (Sino-Bodic)
 Northwestern (Bodic): Bodish, Kirantic, West Himalayish, Tamangic and several isolates
 Northeastern (Sinitic)
 Southern
 Southwestern: Lolo-Burmese, Karenic
 Southeastern: Qiangic, Jiarongic
a number of other small families and isolates as primary branches (Newar, Nungish, Magaric, etc.)

Van Driem points to two main pieces of evidence establishing a special relationship between Sinitic and Bodic and thus placing Chinese within the Tibeto-Burman family. First, there are a number of parallels between the morphology of Old Chinese and the modern Bodic languages. Second, there is an impressive body of lexical cognates between the Chinese and Bodic languages, represented by the Kirantic language Limbu.

In response, Matisoff notes that the existence of shared lexical material only serves to establish an absolute relationship between two language families, not their relative relationship to one another. Although some cognate sets presented by van Driem are confined to Chinese and Bodic, many others are found in Sino-Tibetan languages generally and thus do not serve as evidence for a special relationship between Chinese and Bodic.

Van Driem (2001, 2014)
George van Driem (2001) has also proposed a "fallen leaves" model that lists dozens of well-established low-level groups while remaining agnostic about intermediate groupings of these. In the most recent version (van Driem 2014), 42 groups are identified (with individual languages highlighted in italics):

Bodish
Tshangla
West Himalayish
Tamangic
Newaric
Kiranti
Lepcha
Magaric
Chepangic
Raji–Raute
Dura
'Ole
Gongduk
Lhokpu
Siangic
Kho-Bwa
Hrusish
Digarish
Midžuish
Tani
Dhimalish
Brahmaputran (Sal)
Pyu
Ao
Angami–Pochuri
Tangkhul
Zeme
Meithei
Kukish
Karbi
Mru
Sinitic
Bai
Tujia
Lolo-Burmese
Qiangic
Ersuish
Naic
Rgyalrongic
Kachinic
Nungish
Karenic

van Driem (2007) also suggested that the Sino-Tibetan language family be renamed "Trans-Himalayan", which he considers to be more neutral.

Orlandi (2021) also considers the van Driem's Trans-Himalayan fallen leaves model to be more plausible than the bifurcate classification of Sino-Tibetan being split into Sinitic and Tibeto-Burman.

Blench and Post (2014) 
Roger Blench and Mark W. Post have criticized the applicability of conventional Sino-Tibetan classification schemes to minor languages lacking an extensive written history (unlike Chinese, Tibetic, and Burmese). They find that the evidence for the subclassification or even ST affiliation at all of several minor languages of northeastern India, in particular, is either poor or absent altogether.

In their view, many such languages would for now be best considered unclassified, or "internal isolates" within the family. They propose a provisional classification of the remaining languages:
Sino-Tibetan
Karbi (Mikir)
Mruish
(unnamed group)
(unnamed group)
Tani
Nagish: Ao, Kuki-Chin, Tangkhul, Zeme, Angami–Pochuri and Meitei
(unnamed group)
Western: Gongduk, 'Ole, Mahakiranti, Lepcha, Kham–Magaric–Chepang, Tamangic, and Lhokpu
Karenic
Jingpho–Konyak–Bodo
Eastern 
Tujia
Bai
Northern Qiangic
Southern Qiangic
(unnamed group)
Chinese (Sinitic)
Lolo-Burmese–Naic
Bodish
Nungish
Following that, because they propose that the three best-known branches may actually be much closer related to each other than they are to "minor" Sino-Tibetan languages, Blench and Post argue that "Sino-Tibetan" or "Tibeto-Burman" are inappropriate names for a family whose earliest divergences led to different languages altogether. They support the proposed name "Trans-Himalayan".

Menghan Zhang, Shi Yan, et al. (2019)

A team of researchers led by Pan Wuyun and Jin Li proposed the following phylogenetic tree in 2019, based on lexical items:
Sinitic
Tibeto-Burman
(unnamed group)
Karenic
Kuki-Chin–Naga
(unnamed group)
Sal
(unnamed group)
(unnamed group)
Digarish
Tani
(unnamed group)
(unnamed group)
Himalayish
Nungish
(unnamed group)
Kinauri
(unnamed group)
(unnamed group)
Gurung-Tamang
Bodish
(unnamed group)
(unnamed group)
Naic
Ersuish, Qiangic, Rgyalrongic
Lolo-Burmese

Typology

Word order 

Except for the Chinese, Bai, Karenic, and Mruic languages, the usual word order in Sino-Tibetan languages is object–verb. However, Chinese and Bai differ from almost all other subject–verb–object languages in the world in placing relative clauses before the nouns they modify. Most scholars believe SOV to be the original order, with Chinese, Karen and Bai having acquired SVO order due to the influence of neighbouring languages in the Mainland Southeast Asia linguistic area. This has been criticized as being insufficiently corroborated by Djamouri et al. 2007, who instead reconstruct a VO order for Proto-Sino-Tibetan.

Morphology 

Sino-Tibetan is structurally one of the most diverse language families in the world, including all of the gradation of morphological complexity from isolating (Lolo-Burmese, Tujia) to polysynthetic (Gyalrongic, Kiranti) languages. While Sinitic languages are normally taken to be a prototypical example of the isolating morphological type, southern Chinese languages express this trait far more strongly than northern Chinese languages do.

Hodgson had in 1849 noted a dichotomy between "pronominalized" (inflecting) languages, stretching across the Himalayas from Himachal Pradesh to eastern Nepal, and "non-pronominalized" (isolating) languages. Konow (1909) explained the pronominalized languages as due to a Munda substratum, with the idea that Indo-Chinese languages were essentially isolating as well as tonal. Maspero later attributed the putative substratum to Indo-Aryan. It was not until Benedict that the inflectional systems of these languages were recognized as (partially) native to the family. Scholars disagree over the extent to which the agreement system in the various languages can be reconstructed for the proto-language.

In morphosyntactic alignment, many Tibeto-Burman languages have ergative and/or anti-ergative (an argument that is not an actor) case marking. However, the anti-ergative case markings can not be reconstructed at higher levels in the family and are thought to be innovations.

Vocabulary

External classification
Beyond the traditionally recognized families of Southeast Asia, a number of possible broader relationships have been suggested.

The "Sino-Caucasian" hypothesis of Sergei Starostin posits that the Yeniseian languages and North Caucasian languages form a clade with Sino-Tibetan. The Sino-Caucasian hypothesis has been expanded by others to "Dené–Caucasian" to include the Na-Dené languages of North America, Burushaski, Basque and, occasionally, Etruscan. A narrower binary Dené–Yeniseian family has recently been well received. The validity of the rest of the family, however, is viewed as doubtful or rejected by nearly all historical linguists.

Around 1920 linguist Edward Sapir became convinced that Na–Dené was more closely related to Sino–Tibetan than to other American families. He suggests that the Sino-Tibetan languages are related to the Na-Dené languages.

Geoffrey Caveney (2014) suggests that the Sino-Tibetan and Na-Dene languages are related but his analysis does not support the Sino-Caucasian or Dene-Caucasian hypothesis.

In contrast, Laurent Sagart proposes a Sino-Austronesian family with Sino-Tibetan and Austronesian (including Kra–Dai as a subbranch) as primary branches. Stanley Starosta has extended this proposal with a further branch called "Yangzian" joining Hmong–Mien and Austroasiatic.

August Conrad proposed the Sino-Tibetan-Indo-European language family. This hypothesis holds that there is a genetic relationship between the Sino-Tibetan language family and the Indo-European language family. The earliest comparative linguistic study of Chinese and Indo-European languages was the 18th century Nordic scholar Olaus Rudbeck. He compared the vocabulary of Gothic and Chinese and guessed that the two may be of the same origin. In the second half of the 19th century, Kong Haogu, Shigude, Ijosser, etc. successively proposed that Chinese and European languages are homologous. Among them, Kong Haogu, through the comparison of Chinese and Indo-European domestic animal vocabulary, first proposed Indo-Chinese language macrofamily (including Chinese, Tibetan, Burmese and Indo-European languages). In the 20th century, R. Shafer put forward the conjecture of the Eurasian super language family and listed hundreds of similar words between Tibeto-Burman and Indo-European languages. From the 1960s, Canadian Sinologist Edwin G. Pulleyblank began to argue for the genetic relationship between Sino-Tibetan and Indo-European languages from historical comparative linguistics, anthropology, archaeology, etc. After the 21st century, Zhou Jixu, etc. Chinese scholars also proposed hundreds of cognates of Sino-Tibetan and Indo-European languages.

Notes

References

Citations

Works cited 

 
 
 
 
 
 
 
  (preprint )
 
 
 
 
 
 
 
 
 
 
 
 
 
 
 
 
 
 
 
 
 
  reprinted as

General

External links

James Matisoff, "Tibeto-Burman languages and their subgrouping"

Sino-Tibetan Branches Project (STBP)
Behind the Sino-Tibetan Database of Lexical Cognates: Introductory remarks
Sinotibetan Lexical Homology Database
Guillaume Jacques, "The Genetic Position of Chinese"
Marc Miyake (2014), "Why Sino-Tibetan reconstruction is not like Indo-European reconstruction (yet)"
Andrew Hsiu (2018), "Linking the Sino-Tibetan fallen leaves"

 
Language families
Sino-Austronesian languages